Hendricks County Jail and Sheriff's Residence, also known as Hendricks County Museum, is a historic home and jail located at Danville, Hendricks County, Indiana.  It was built in 1866–1867, and is a two-story, Second Empire style brick building with a three-story square tower.  It has a slate mansard roof and segmental arched openings.  It consists of the former Sheriff's residence in front and a one-story rear wing with later additions containing the jail.  The building has housed the Hendricks County Museum since 1974.

It was added to the National Register of Historic Places in 1983.  It is located in the Danville Courthouse Square Historic District.

References

External links
Hendricks County Museum website

History museums in Indiana
Jails on the National Register of Historic Places in Indiana
Second Empire architecture in Indiana
Government buildings completed in 1867
National Register of Historic Places in Hendricks County, Indiana
Buildings and structures in Hendricks County, Indiana
Historic district contributing properties in Indiana
Jails in Indiana
Houses on the National Register of Historic Places in Indiana